The Chainheart Machine is the second studio album by Swedish melodic death metal band Soilwork. It is the first Soilwork release to feature guitarist Ola Frenning and drummer Henry Ranta.

There is an instrumental hidden track on "Room No 99"  as the song ends at 5:00 followed by silence until the 7:00 minute mark where the hidden track begins. The hidden track transitions perfectly into the opening title track.

Track listing

Credits

Soilwork
 Bjorn "Speed" Strid − vocals
 Peter Wichers − guitar
 Ola Frenning − guitar
 Ola Flink − bass
 Carlos Del Olmo Holmberg − keyboards
 Henry Ranta − drums

Guests
 Mattias Eklundh − guitar solo on "Machinegun Majesty"
 Mattias Nilsson - 2009 remastering

Release history

References

Soilwork albums
2000 albums
Century Media Records albums
Concept albums
Albums recorded at Studio Fredman
Albums produced by Fredrik Nordström